Evson Patrício Vanconcelos do Nascimento (born December 9, 1990) is a Brazilian professional footballer who plays as a defender for Thailand club Chiangmai United in Thai League 1

Club statistics
Updated to 23 February 2016.

References

External links

Profile at Kamatamare Sanuki

1990 births
Living people
Brazilian footballers
Brazilian expatriate footballers
Expatriate footballers in Japan
J1 League players
J2 League players
Esporte Clube Vitória players
Sport Club Corinthians Alagoano players
Paulista Futebol Clube players
Gamba Osaka players
Kamatamare Sanuki players
Al-Faisaly FC players
Saudi Professional League players
Association football defenders